Urhobo is a South-Western Edoid language spoken by the Urhobo people of southern Nigeria.

From the region of Delta and Bayelsa State. They are also known as fishermen. Their neighbours are the Isoko to the South East, the Itsekiri to the West, Ijaw to the South and Ukwuani people to the North East.

Urhobo people are referred to as "Urhobians" or "Urhobeans"

Phonology
Urhobo has a rather reduced system of sound inventory compared to proto-Edoid.

It has a conservative consonant inventory for an Edoid language. It maintains three nasals, and only five oral consonants, have nasal allophones before nasal vowels.

  is interchangeable with  only before nasal vowels.
  can be heard as  before non-front vowels.
 Approximants  are heard as nasalized approximants  before and after nasal vowels.
 Rhotics  may have different realizations as alveolar or retroflex, and can be articulated as approximants , or taps . A retroflex lateral flap  can also be heard in syllable-final position.

According to Ukere (1986), Urhobo has two tones, a high tone and a low tone. These can also combine to form rising and falling tones.

Dictionaries
Urhobo dictionaries have been compiled by Ukere, Osubele, Ebireri Okrokoto of Urhobo Language Institute, and Julius Arerierian. A wordlist of nouns and verbs  of  Okpe, Urhobo and Uvwie was compiled by Akpobọmẹ Diffrẹ-Odiete with funding from Foundation for Endangered Languages.

Syntax
Urhobo has the SVO constituent order type as illustrated with the example below:

References

Sources
Ukere, Anthony Obakpọnọvwẹ. 1986. Urhobo-English dictionary. Benin City: Ilupeju Press. (revised and edited version by Roger Blench)
Frank Kügler, Caroline Féry, Ruben Van De Vijver (2009) Variation and Gradience in Phonetics and Phonology
Okrokoto Ebireri. Ukoko re Ephere R'Urhobo

Edoid languages